Karen Ignagni (b. 1954, Providence, RI) is the President and Chief Executive Officer of EmblemHealth as of 9/1/2015, until which time she was the President and Chief Executive Officer of America's Health Insurance Plans (AHIP), formerly HIAA (Health Insurance Association of America).  She is often mentioned as one of the most effective lobbyists and the most powerful people in healthcare. She is involved in health care reform in the United States, working to benefit health insurance companies.

Background
Ignagni grew up in Providence, where her father was a fireman and mother worked at the city hall, her brother Robert currently resides in South Windsor, CT.  She graduated from the Providence College, where she majored in political science, and from Loyola College Executive MBA program.

Ignagni led the American Association of Health Plans (AAHP) from 1993 until 2003 when it merged with the Health Insurance Association of America. Before joining AAHP, she was a director of the AFL-CIO's Department of Employee Benefits.  Previously she worked in the U.S. Senate Labor and Human Resources Committee, the U.S. Department of Health and Human Services, and as a staffer for Senator Claiborne Pell.

Ignagni wrote articles on health care policy issues in The New York Times, USA Today, the New York Daily News, and New England Journal of Medicine, among others.  She  sits advisory groups and boards including the Board of the National Academy of Social Insurance, the Partnership for Prevention, and the Bryce Harlow Foundation.

Recognition 

She received the Second Century Award for Excellence in Health Care. George Magazine listed her among 50 Most Powerful People in Politics. The New York Times wrote in 1999 that "in a city teeming with health care lobbyists, Ms. Ignagni is widely considered one of the most effective. She blends a detailed knowledge of health policy with an intuitive feel for politics." The Hill newspaper included her among Washington's most effective lobbyists in 2004. She is also an occasional object of derision, such as when Health Care for America Now group awarded Ignagni a "protector of profits" award.

2009 health care reform debate 

In June 2009, Ignagni addressed President Barack Obama: "You have our commitment to play, to contribute and to help pass health care reform this year". In October 2009, AHIP issued a report projecting sharply rising costs with or without reform. The study was conducted by PricewaterhouseCoopers.  As described by Ignagni, "The report makes clear that several major provisions in the current legislative proposal will cause healthcare costs to increase far faster and higher than they would under the current system". Ignagni defended the report on PBS Newshour against the accusation by Nancy-Ann DeParle, the director of the White House Office of Health Reform, that the "industry puts their special interest ahead of the national interests here".

References

External links 

American lobbyists
1954 births
Living people
AFL–CIO people
Health policy in the United States
Providence College alumni
Loyola University Maryland alumni
Businesspeople from Providence, Rhode Island